Martin Olsen may refer to:
 Martin Olsen (bandy) (1920–1979), Norwegian bandy player
 Martin Olsen (boxer) (1894–1971), Danish boxer
 Martin Spang Olsen (born 1962), lecturer, stuntman, writer and actor

See also
 Martin Olson (born 1952), American comedy writer and television producer
 Martin Olsson (born 1988), Swedish footballer